Attorney General Whitaker may refer to:

Frederick Whitaker (1812–1891), Attorney-General of New Zealand
Matthew Whitaker (born 1969), Acting Attorney General of the United States
Norman William Whittaker (1893–1983), Attorney General of British Columbia

See also
General Whitaker (disambiguation)